Avtar Singh Karimpuri, is an Indian politician of the Bahujan Samaj Party (BSP) from Punjab. He is President of Bahujan Samaj Party Punjab Unit and is ex-Rajya Sabha member.

See also
Kanshi Ram

References

External links
 Detailed Profile

1964 births
Living people
Rajya Sabha members from Uttar Pradesh
Bahujan Samaj Party politicians from Punjab, India